There are over 9,000 Grade I listed buildings in England. This page is a list of these buildings in the district of Richmondshire in North Yorkshire.

Richmondshire

|}

Notes

External links

Richmondshire
Richmondshire
Richmondshire